was a Japanese political activist who committed seppuku with Yukio Mishima in Tokyo.

Morita was the youngest child of the headmaster of an elementary school. Losing both parents at the age of three, Morita was cared for by his brother Osamu and educated at a Catholic school. He entered Waseda University in 1966, but was dismayed by the presence of Communist Zengakuren students at the University and became heavily involved in the small right-wing faction at the university. He first met Mishima on 19 June 1967, and joined the Tatenokai at its establishment in October 1968. As early as March of that year, he had written a letter to Mishima expressing a willingness to die for him.

Mishima was interested in using his society for direct political action, and he approached several members in April and May 1970. No clear plan was developed until late June. Shortly afterwards, Mishima went on holiday to Shimoda and paid for the others to go to Hokkaido. On 2 September in Tokyo, Morita and "Chibi Koga" recruited  ("Furu" Koga), who was a Tatenokai member also, and he met Mishima to hear details of the plan on 9 September.

Originally all four Tatenokai members had planned to commit seppuku along with Mishima. However, Mishima attempted to dissuade them and three of the members acquiesced to his wishes. Only Morita persisted, saying, "I can't let Mr. Mishima die alone." So, in November, Mishima ruled that only he and Morita were to die. Morita said to other members who had wanted to die together, "We are alive or dead together, because we can meet again somewhere." But Mishima knew that Morita had a girlfriend and still hoped he might live. On 21 and 22 November 1970, supplies were bought, and Morita asked Hiroyasu Koga to stand in for him if he should fail to behead Mishima properly. The next two days were spent rehearsing.

On the morning of 25 November, the group drove to the Japan Self-Defense Force's Ichigaya garrison on the pretext of a friendly visit. They barricaded themselves inside General Mashita's office, taking him prisoner, and issued demands. At noon, Mishima began to make a speech from the balcony to assembled troops, but his words were drowned out by helicopters. Immediately after his return from the balcony, Mishima stabbed himself in the abdomen and Morita then attempted to behead him. After three failed attempts by Morita, Hiroyasu Koga stepped in and beheaded Mishima. According to the testimony of the surviving coup members, just before his seppuku, Mishima tried one more time to dissuade Morita, saying "Morita, you must live, not die." Nevertheless, after Mishima's seppuku, Morita knelt and stabbed himself in the abdomen and Koga again performed the kaishakunin duty.

Masayoshi Koga, Masahiro Ogawa, and Hiroyasu Koga were freed from prison for good behavior in October 1974. All three were aged 26 at the time.

References

Notes

Further reading 

 First edition published 1989.
 First edition published in May 1972.

 First edition published 1971.

 

1945 births
1970 suicides
Attempted coups in Japan
College students who committed suicide
Deaths by decapitation
Japanese anti-communists
Japanese nationalists
People from Mie Prefecture
People of Shōwa-period Japan
Seppuku from Meiji period to present
Waseda University alumni
Yukio Mishima
Suicides by sharp instrument in Japan
1970s coups d'état and coup attempts